Pestarella is a genus of thalassinidean crustacean erected in 2003 from former members of the genus Callianassa. It is distinguished from Callianassa by the rounded, rather than squarish telson, and by the absence of the first two pleopods in males. The genus contains the following species:
Pestarella candida (Olivi, 1792)
Pestarella convexa (de Saint Laurent & Le Loeuff, 1979)
Pestarella rotundicaudata (Stebbing, 1902)
Pestarella tyrrhena (Petagna, 1792)
Pestarella whitei (Sakai, 1999)

References

Thalassinidea